Bashar Matti Warda (born 15 June 1969 in Baghdad, Iraq) is a Chaldean Catholic cleric and the current Archbishop of Erbil (in the Kurdistan Region of Iraq).

Biography 

Born in 1969, Warda joined the Saint Peter's Chaldean seminary in Baghdad and was ordained a priest in 1993. In 1995, he joined the Redemptorist order of Flanders in Belgium. After receiving his master's at the Catholic University of Louvain in 1999, he returned to Iraq.

Warda was apostolic administrator of the Diocese of Zaku from July 2011 until its merger with the Diocese of Amadiyah in June 2013.

In 2009, the Synod of Bishops of the Chaldean Catholic Church elected him Archbishop of the Archeparchy of Erbil. After Pope Benedict XVI gave his consent to this election in 2010 he was consecrated on 3 July of the same year.;

On 17 May 2017, he was received by His Royal Highness Charles, Prince of Wales in Clarence House, London.

Archbishop Warda is well known for his wide-ranging defense and support for the Christians and minorities in Iraq. His efforts to support the continuing Christian presence in Iraq were widely noticed through many media interviews and speeches in different universities and councils worldwide, including Georgetown University 2018, CNA in 2018, Catholic Herald in 2020, BBC HARDtalk in 2022, Catholic New York Newspaper in 2022, The Tablet in 2022, and Prospect Magazine in 2017.

On 3 December 2019, he gave a speech in the UN Security Council Meeting in New York Concerning the Situation in Iraq during the protests of the Iraqi youth in October that year.

Foundations and establishments

Khaymat A-Athra primary School in Baghdad (2005) 
In response to the bombing of Mar Elia Chaldean Catholic Parish in southern Baghdad on 1 August 2004, he built a primary school for the neighborhood to give a chance to the local community to strengthen their roots in their homeland, to live in social cohesion and mutual respect for social diversity, which he believes is a core value of any educational center.

St. Adday and St. Mari Patriarchal Complex in Erbil (2008) 
Following the violence against Christians and churches in Baghdad in 2004–2006, which made it very difficult for attending seminarians of the St. Peter seminary in Baghdad to resume their formation programs. Thus, being appointed by the Chaldean patriarch as the rector of the seminary, he founded the St. Aday and St. Mari complex in Ankawa to allow the seminarians to resume their spiritual, theological, and pastoral formation without interruption.

Mar Qardakh International School (2011) 
Archbishop Warda introduced the international educational system in the Kurdistan Region of Iraq through founding Mar Qardakh School, which educates children from grades 1–12 in the English language, to grant them the International Baccalaureate (IB) which became recognized as a fully accredited IB-Program school in 2015.

Catholic University in Erbil (2016) 
Following huge efforts with many stakeholders and officials, Archbishop Warda founded the Catholic University in Erbil, and was officially opened on 8 December 2015.

Ankawa Humanitarian Committee - AHC (2020) 
In early 2020, he founded the Ankawa Humanitarian Committee (AHC), a Non-governmental organization that works on the fundamental challenges of humanitarian and development facing the long-suffering communities in Iraq; including economic poverty, education, women's empowerment, social cohesion, environmental awareness, and the promotion of full rights for all as equal citizens of Iraq. He is also the head of Board of Directors of the NGO, where he closely monitor the implementation of the humanitarian and developmental projects in the different areas.

Maryamana Hospital (2021) 
He founded the Maryamana Hospital in 2021, which is a Catholic community based hospital that was established with the sole purpose to provide healthcare in a Catholic spirit of equality and interfaith, serving all, the poor, the vulnerable, and those without a voice. He is also the head of the Board of Trustees of the non-profit organization that aims to lead the improvement of healthcare throughout Kurdistan and Iraq.

Advocating for H.R. 390 
In collective efforts toward recognizing the persecution of religious minorities, Archbishop Warda worked with the Knights of Columbus since 2015 to collect witnesses and evidence to declare attack of ISIS against Christians and Yazidis in Iraq and Syria as an act of genocide and crime against humanity. The resolution was put into law on Tuesday, 11 December 2018, as he presented at the white house during the signing of law H.R. 390, the “Iraq and Syria Genocide Relief and Accountability Act of 2018,” that allowed direct assistance to communities in Iraq or Syria. This law was signed by the President of the United States of America, Donald J. Trump.

Gallery

References

External links

 Archbishop Bashar Warda, Catholic Hierarchy

Living people
1969 births
Chaldean archbishops
Iraqi archbishops
Iraqi Eastern Catholics
People from Baghdad
20th-century Eastern Catholic clergy
21st-century Eastern Catholic bishops
Redemptorist bishops